The Cabinet of Bangladesh is the chief executive body of the People's Republic of Bangladesh. The cabinet is the collective decision-making body of the entire government under the Office of the Prime Minister, composed of the prime minister and some 25 cabinet ministers, 7 advisers, 18 state ministers and 3 deputy ministers.

Responsibility

Ministers of the government, according to the Constitution of Bangladesh, are selected primarily from the elected members of House of Nation, also known as Jatiya Sangsad. Cabinet ministers are heads of government departments, mostly with the office of the "Minister of [department, e.g. Defence]". The collective co-ordinating function of the cabinet is reinforced by the statutory position that all the ministers jointly hold the same office, and can exercise the same powers.

The cabinet is the ultimate decision-making body of the executive within the parliamentary system of government in traditional constitutional theory of Bangladesh. This interpretation was originally put across in the work of the Bangladesh constitution in 1972. The political and decision-making authority of the cabinet has been gradually increased over the last few decades, with some claiming its role has been usurped by "Prime Ministerial" (i.e. more "presidential") government.

The cabinet is the executive committee of The Prime Minister's Office, a historic body which has legislative, judicial and executive functions, and whose large membership does include member(s) of the opposition or coalition. Its decisions are generally implemented either under the existing powers of individual government departments, or by the Cabinet Secretary, the most senior civil servant in Bangladesh.

Current cabinet and cabinet-rank officials
The most influential part of the executive of the Bangladesh government are the ministries. A ministry headed by a Minister or State minister (Independent Charges) shall be responsible for conducting the business of his Ministry/Division in the Parliament unless otherwise directed by the Prime Minister's Office. The Secretary is the administrative head of a ministry or division; and is assisted by an Additional Secretary, Joint Secretary, Deputy Secretary, Senior Assistant Secretary and Assistant Secretary.  A few ministries consist of more than one division.

There are four categories of ministers, in descending order of rank:

 Minister: member of cabinet; leads a ministry	
 State Minister (Independent Charges): junior minister not reporting to a cabinet minister; leads a ministry
 State Minister: junior minister reporting to a cabinet minister, usually tasked with a specific responsibility in that ministry
 Deputy Minister: most junior minister reporting to a cabinet minister or Minister of State (Independent Charges)

Political party

List of previous cabinets

References

 
Government of Bangladesh
Bangladesh